The Olympus Stylus 1 is a digital superzoom bridge camera by Olympus Corporation, later upgraded to "Olympus Stylus 1s".

References
http://www.dpreview.com/products/olympus/compacts/oly_stylus1/specifications

https://cameradecision.com/compare/Olympus-XZ-1-vs-Olympus-Stylus-1

Bridge digital cameras
Stylus 1
Cameras introduced in 2013